Brucella ciceri is a gram-negative, oxidase- and catalase-positive, aerobic bacteria from the genus of Brucella which was isolated from Cicer arietinum in Pakistan.

References

External links
Type strain of Ochrobactrum ciceri at BacDive -  the Bacterial Diversity Metadatabase

 

Hyphomicrobiales
Bacteria described in 2010